Sitobion lambersi, also known as Sitobion (Sitobion) lambersi, is an aphid in the superfamily Aphidoidea in the order Hemiptera. It is a true bug and sucks sap from plants.

References 

 ADW: Sitobion lambersi: CLASSIFICATION
 species Sitobion (Sitobion) lambersi David, 1956: Aphid Species File
 AgroAtlas - Pests - Sitobion (Macrosiphum) avenae Fabricius - English Grain Aphid.
 English Grain Aphid - Oklahoma State University

Agricultural pest insects
Insects described in 1956
Macrosiphini